Miklós Somogyi (born 19 August 1962) is a Hungarian former cyclist. He competed at the 1988 Summer Olympics and the 1992 Summer Olympics.

References

1962 births
Living people
Hungarian male cyclists
Olympic cyclists of Hungary
Cyclists at the 1988 Summer Olympics
Cyclists at the 1992 Summer Olympics
Cyclists from Budapest